Harvest was a Christian band founded in Lindale, Texas, by Jerry Williams in 1977. The vision of Harvest was to see 100 million people come to know Jesus Christ personally through the band's music ministry.

History
Jerry Williams came from a nightclub entertainment background, and music had been a major part of his life. In an interview, Williams stated that "[he] realized there had to be more to life than sports cars and dating beauty queens . . . I became a Christian." Williams spent some time playing the guitar on Texas streets before becoming a pastor in Bloomington, Indiana.   

Along with Jerry Williams, the original members of Harvest were Ed Kerr and Paul Wilbur, both of whom were music students. Wilbur had met Williams at a church where Williams was the youth pastor, and Williams had been influential in Wilbur's decision to become a Christian. Ed Kerr, who graduated from Indiana University with an M.A. in piano performance, was a mutual friend of both Williams and Wilbur. Kerr met Williams at a rally at Indiana University in Bloomington and made a decision to become a Christian afterwards. The three men collaborated on the first two albums created by Harvest: Harvest and Morning Sun. 

Later in 1981, personal problems forced Williams to disband the original Harvest group, which at one time had numbered five. The group was reformed as a duo of Williams and Kerr. Williams and Kerr were together for the production of many records, including It's Alright Now, Send Us to the World, Voices, Only the Overcomers, Give Them Back, Holy Fire and Carry On. In 1982 the magazine CCM took notice of the duo in its article, "A Bountiful Harvest."
The writer praised the group's vocal harmonies and was especially fond of the song "Because I Am" (found on the album It's Alright Now).

In 1988, Discovery Broadcasting Network recorded a live video of Harvest in concert.  On the cover of the video, the network stated that Harvest averages "over 100 concerts a year." 

By 1991, Ed Kerr left the group and Harvest became a five-player band led by Williams. With various members, Williams' band produced Let's Fight (For a Generation), Mighty River, and 41 Will Come. In 1992 the band went on an "Olympic and European Tour." They performed in Spain at the Barcelona Summer Olympics and at the Sevilla World Expo. Their tour also took them into Germany as part of Operation Mobilisation's "Love Europe" crusade. Harvest finished its tour with a performance in the Netherlands.

Music Style
According to Jerry Williams in 1988, Harvest's sound was "light middle-of-the-road to light contemporary rock." He described it as hard to classify because it was a real mixture of styles.  The group sound incorporated a little bit of rock, some country, and really good harmonies. Williams likened the group's harmonization to the Gatlin Brothers, who he had grown up listening to. Williams also said that "Every time people have tried to figure out who we sound like, we sound like Harvest.  There's really no one else who sounds like us." But, when pressed to liken the band's sound to another's style, Williams said it was similar to that of Christian performer Wayne Watson.

Discography

Studio albums 
Everlasting Spring
 1979: Harvest
Milk & Honey Records
 1981: Morning Sun
 1982: It's Alright Now
 1983: Send Us to the World
 1984: Voices
Greentree Records
 1985: The Best of Harvest
 1986: Only the Overcomers
 1987: Give Them Back
Benson Records
 1988: Holy Fire
 1990: Carry On
 1991: The Early Works
 1991: Let's Fight (For a Generation)
 1993: Mighty River
 1995: 41 Will Come

Videos 
 1987: A Call to Action
 1992: Let's Fight (For a Generation)

Jerry Williams Discography

Studio albums 
 1996: Warriors Arise
 2001: Flood Over Me
 2003: The Angel's Anthem
 2006: Gideon,A Mighty Warrior
 2009: Thank You
 2013: Psalms Project Musical Devotional
 2016: Christmastime EP (5 songs including the popular "O Holy Night" from the "Jesus, The Best Gift of All" CD (Benson,1994)
 2019: The Psalms Project Vol. 1-3 (3CDs)
 2019: Hold the Fort
 2020: Church Arise
 2021: Marching On
 2022: All the Praise
 2022: Unfailing Love

Ed Kerr Discography
 1990 Unexpected Turns
 2011 Christmas In Ivory
 2021 The Winter, The Wind

Christian Radio Hits

See also
 Jesus Music

References

External links
Jerry Williams and Harvest music available! Go to Epic Ministries CDs and Products Page 
Harvest website
Harvest blog
Christian Music Archive's Harvest page
One-way.org's Jesus Music website
YouTube Harvest Fans' page

Musical groups established in 1977
Christian rock groups from Texas
American gospel musical groups